Stenay is a commune in the Meuse department in Grand Est in north-eastern France.

Its inhabitants are called Stenaisiens.

History

In 679, the assassinated king Dagobert II was buried in the church of Saint-Remi in Stenay. In 872, King Charles the Bald had his body moved a newly built basilica dedicated to him. In 1069, the canons of the basilica were accused of laxness. Duke Godfrey the Bearded handed the basilica over to Gorze Abbey and it became a Benedictine priory. The Vita Dagoberti was written there. In 1580, the basilica was secularized and the cloisters demolished. In 1591, what remained was sacked by Huguenots.

Stenay was one of the last villages to experience fighting during the First World War. The village was captured on 11 November 1918 by the U.S. 89th Division, commanded by Major General William M. Wright, only hours before the Armistice with Germany went into effect. The 89th Division lost 365 men, mainly to enemy howitzer fire.

Toponymy
According to local tradition in antiquity, the village is named after a local temple of Saturn. The name has changed significantly over time, starting with Sathanagium and Astenidum, and, through natural language change, resulting in Stenay.

The progression of names is as follows: 
Sathanagium, Sathonagium (714)
Astenidum (877) 
Astanid (888) 
Satenaium (900s) 
Sathaniacum (900s) 
Sathinidium (1036) 
Sathanacum (1069) 
Setunia (1000s) 
Sathanacum villam (1079) 
Satiniacum, Sathiniacum (1086) 
Sathanaco (1108) 
Sathanacensi (1157) 
Sathaniaco (1159) 
Sathanai (1173) 
Sethenac (1208) 
Settenai (1243) 
Sethenai (1264) 
Sathenay (1276, 1399, 1463, 1483, 1549, 1558, 1585) 
Sathanay (1284) 
Satenay (1399) 
Astenæum (1580) 
Satanagus (1630) 
Satanay, Sthenay (1643) 
Stenay (1793).

Population

Tourism
The European Beer Museum (Musée Européen de la bière), founded in 1986, is considered the largest of its kind on the continent.

See also
 Communes of the Meuse department

References

External links

 Stenay tourist office
 Stenay and the Myth
 Moulin le Cygne the Myth of Satan [ web.archive.org]  History of the town

Communes of Meuse (department)
Champagne (province)
Priory of Sion hoax